Dignum is a surname. Notable people with the surname include:

Danny Dignum (born 1992), British boxer
Charles Dignum ( 1765–1827), British tenor singer, actor, and composer 
Frank Dignum (born 1961), Dutch computer scientist
Virginia Dignum (born 1964), computer scientist